Heinrich Eggestein (born around 1415/1420 in Rosheim, Alsace; died 1488 or later; also spelled Eckstein or Eggesteyn) is considered, along with Johannes Mentelin, to be the earliest book printer in Strasbourg and therefore one of the earliest anywhere in Europe outside Mainz.

Life 
Before he came to Strasbourg in the beginning of the 1440s, Heinrich Eggestein had already acquired the academic degree of a Magister artium liberalium at a university which is still unknown. Already shortly after his arrival, he entered the service of Bishop Rupert of Palatinate-Simmern and held the office of Siegelbewahrer (keeper of the seal, also called Insiegler or Siegelträger) at the Strasbourg provost court, which he lost again in 1455. In 1461, this office was again given to him and three years later, he finally lost it.

He got the rights of a Strasbourg citizen in 1442. It is assumed that Eggestein became personally acquainted with Johannes Gutenberg, the later inventor of printing books with movable type, during his stay in Strasbourg in the 1440s and that he was able to form a lasting bond with him.

It is highly likely that Eggestein even travelled to Mainz himself in the 1450s to learn the art of book printing from Gutenberg. When this was and how long the stay lasted cannot be definitely resolved, due to sketchy source materials.  holds the view that Eggestein was already in Mainz in 1454 and that might be why he lost the office of Siegelbewahrer in Strasbourg in 1455. If this were the case, then he could have watched the printing of the 42-line-per-page Gutenberg Bible firsthand. Geldner further suspects that Heinrich Eggestein actively participated in the typesetting and printing of the Türkenkalender, which was completed in the middle of December in 1454. He did not give up his Strasbourg citizen's rights until August 1457, however. If he had left Alsace so late, he would have admittedly arrived in Mainz after the break between Gutenberg and Johann Fust.

Heinrich Eggestein's return to Strasbourg is certainly verified, as he again got the rights of citizenship on 9 August 1459. However, it is not known whether and in what way Eggestein might have participated in the printing shop operated by Johannes Metelin in Strasbourg. It is indisputable, however, that the two men knew each other and had a close relationship. It is even thought to be possible that Mentelin and Eggestein swore to keep their knowledge of the art of book printing a secret, through an agreement which has unfortunately not been preserved.

The decision to found his own printery may have been made in the time around 1464, when Eggestein lost his office of Siegelbewahrer for the second time, possibly in connection with the setting up of the Offizin (an old German term for a book printery). On 31 March 1466 the printer received a Schutzbrief of the Elector Frederick I of the Palatinate, giving him special protection, somewhat like a patent. His first larger work is considered to be a Latin Bible, which must have been produced before 24 May 1466.

Although his printery was quickly able to establish itself in the market, Heinrich Eggestein got into financial difficulties towards the end of the 1470s. He was indebted to the Basel paper merchant, Anton Galliciani, and was successfully sued by him in 1480 for the immediate payment of all outstanding debts. On 24 April 1483 Eggestein finally gave up his rights as a citizen of Strasbourg. The last printed works which were made by him or with his type were popular prints. He was no longer mentioned after 1488. The date and circumstances of his death are unknown.

Work 
Heinrich Eggestein's activities as a book printer can be established from 1464 until 1488. During these 25 years, he published a wealth of printed works with varied content. After his first work, the Bible of 1466 which has already been mentioned, he printed two further Latin folio editions of the Holy Scriptures. In this connection, the Strasbourg printer also used modern marketing methods. Eggestein's book advertisement of 1468/70, which promoted his third edition of the Bible, is considered to be the oldest pamphlet of this kind, along with the advertisements of Mentelin and Schöffer.

At the beginning of the 1470s, he began to expand his printing and publishing range. Besides theological works, Eggestein now increasingly printed legal works of canon and civil law, such as the Decretum Gratiani (1471), as well as the Decretales of Gregory IX and the Constitutiones of Pope Clement V. That put him in direct competition with Peter Schöffer, who also issued legal titles in on a large scale. Furthermore, Heinrich Eggestein printed antique classics (e.g., Virgil's Bucolica, Cicero's De officiis or Julius Caesar's De bello gallico), but directed his special interest to Latin works of Medieval authors. Thus he published the Legenda aurea of Jacobus de Voragine, De miseria conditionis humanae by Pope Innocent III, as well as works by Bonaventura and Bernhard von Clairvaux, among others. German language titles were quite rare in his range. Further vernacular titles were Lucius Apuleius' The Golden Ass (Translator: Niklas von Wyle) and an edition of Belial.

Literature 
In German

 P. Amelung: Heinrich Eggestein. In. Lexikon des gesamten Buchwesens (LGB). Publ. by Severin Corsten. 2nd new, completely revised and expanded edition. Vol. II. Hiersemann, Stuttgart 1989. p. 420-421. 
 F. Geldner: Die deutschen Inkunabeldrucker. Ein Handbuch der deutschen Buchdrucker des XV. Jahrhunderts nach Druckorten. Teil 1. Das deutsche Sprachgebiet. Hiersemann, Stuttgart 1968. 
 F. Geldner: Inkunabelkunde. Eine Einführung in die Welt des frühesten Buchdrucks. Reichert, Wiesbaden 1978. 
 E. Voulliéme: Die deutschen Drucker des fünfzehnten Jahrhunderts. Verlag der Reichdruckerei, Berlin 1922

References

External link
 

15th-century births
1488 deaths
People from Rosheim
Alsatian-German people
Printers of incunabula
German typographers and type designers
German printers
German calligraphers